Paul Kavanagh or Cavana(u)gh may refer to:

Paul Kavanagh (politician) (died 2022), Irish businessman and politician
Paul Kavanagh (visual effects artist), British visual effects artist
Paul Kavanagh (criminal) (died 2015), Irish criminal who was shot dead
Lawrence Block (born 1938), author who occasionally used the pen name Paul Kavanagh
Paul Cavanagh (1888–1964), English actor
Paul Cavanaugh, ice hockey player in 1999 Metro Atlantic Athletic Conference Men's Ice Hockey Tournament